Tef or TEF may refer to:

 Eragrostis tef, a cereal from Ethiopia
 Teaching Excellence Framework, a UK government assessment of the quality of undergraduate teaching in universities
  (stock symbol TEF)
 Tennessee Ernie Ford (1919–1991), American singer
 , a test of fluency in French
 The Elias Fund, a nonprofit organization empowering development in Zimbabwean youth
 The Endless Forest, an online game
 Thermic effect of food, an increment of energy expenditure
 TEF (gene), Thyrotrophic embryonic factor, a human gene
 Total enclosure fetishism, a form of sexual fetishism
 Toxic equivalency factor for dioxins and dioxin-like compounds
 Tracheoesophageal fistula, a medical condition
 Transeuropa Ferries, a defunct ferry operator
 Textual Editing Framework, a textual modeling tool for the Eclipse Modeling Framework software engineering facility
 Telfer Airport, IATA airport code "TEF"